Women in Shanghai is a 2018 Chinese streaming television series. Directed by Cheng Liang stars Wang Zhen Er, Li Cheng Bin and Li Xian. The series  premiered on Youku on May 8, 2018.

Plot Summary
The story of a girl who comes from a small-town decides to stay in Shanghai after graduation and work her way up to become the top 10% of the population.

Casts
 Wang Zhen Er as Luo Haiyan
 Li Cheng Bin as Zhang Tianhao
 Li Xian as Chen Xiaowei
 Sheng Yi Lun as Yan Bing
 Yuan Wen Kang as Yang Chengyuan
 Joe Ma as Cai Zhongxian
 Yao Lu as Lin Li
 Guan Xin as Niu Dameng
 Tie Wei Guang as Bai Qiang
 Liu Mei as Si Jiali
 Jin Sha as Xu Xiao
 Ma Xin Yi as Lu Manni

References

Chinese web series